The Ambassador of Australia to Brazil is an officer of the Australian Department of Foreign Affairs and Trade and the head of the Embassy of the Commonwealth of Australia to the Federative Republic of Brazil. The current Ambassador since November 2018 is Tim Kane, who resides in Brasilia.

List of heads of mission

See also
 Australia–Brazil relations

References

 
Brazil
Australia